György Csányi was a Hungarian politician and official from the old noble Csányi family.

György (III) Csányi was born as the son of Ferenc (I) Csányi and his second wife Mária Akács. He had several siblings, including László II, a judge in Vas County. György III married Terézia Nagy de Zalaapáti, they had four children, including Antal I, a Hussar captain, and Márton III, who functioned as the crown prosecutor of Zala County from 1793 to 1797.

He served as first vice-ispán of Zala County from 22 January 1758 to 9 January 1760.

References

Sources

 

18th-century Hungarian people
Gyorgy